Renealmia sessilifolia is a species of plant in the family Zingiberaceae. It is endemic to Ecuador.  Its natural habitat is subtropical or tropical moist montane forests.

References

sessilifolia
Endemic flora of Ecuador
Near threatened plants
Taxonomy articles created by Polbot